Necati Er (born 24 February 1997) is a Turkish athlete specialising in the triple jump.

Early life
Necati Er was born in Samsun, northern Turkey on 24 February 1997. In his youth, he developed an interest in sports. His teacher of physical education in middle school invited him to athletic trainings. At the same time, he played football. His father, earning a limited income, did not want him to perform further sports, while his mother supported him. His father permitted him only to play football, and did not let him perform athletics because he saw no future in that sport branch. One week before Er was about to join a football team, he was admitted to the athletics team. He became regional champion in Samsun, and then was entitled to compete at the Turkish championships, at which he became runner-up and champion. After his successes, his father agreed with his sports activities. He performed the sprint and long jump before he decided to specialise in the triple jump.

Sports career
Er was able to improve his techniques after the Turkish Athletic Federation appointed a foreign coach for the triple jump.

With this result, he received a quota for the Athletics at the 2020 Summer Olympics.

International competitions

Personal bests
Outdoor
Long jump – 7.41 (+0.7 m/s, Cluj-Napoca 2019)
Triple jump – 17.37 (+1.1 m/s, Gävle 2019) NR
Indoor
Long jump – 6.68 (Istanbul 2014)
Triple jump – 16.61 (Istanbul 2018)

References

External links

1997 births
Living people
Sportspeople from Samsun
Turkish male triple jumpers
Athletes (track and field) at the 2020 Summer Olympics
Olympic athletes of Turkey
Olympic male triple jumpers
Athletes (track and field) at the 2022 Mediterranean Games
20th-century Turkish people
21st-century Turkish people